Robert Ritchie Craig (born 29 March 1882, date of death unknown) was an Australian rules footballer who played with Melbourne in the Victorian Football League (VFL).

References

External links 
		
Demonwiki profile

1882 births
Year of death missing
Australian rules footballers from Victoria (Australia)
Melbourne Football Club players